Gonzalo Nicolás Rizzo Sánchez (born 27 December 1995) is a Uruguayan footballer who plays as a defender for Cusco FC in the Peruvian Primera División.

References

External links
Profile at FOX Sports

1995 births
Living people
Uruguayan footballers
Uruguayan expatriate footballers
C.A. Rentistas players
C.A. Progreso players
Rampla Juniors players
Carlos A. Mannucci players
Cusco FC footballers
Uruguayan Primera División players
Uruguayan Segunda División players
Peruvian Primera División players
Association football defenders
Uruguayan expatriate sportspeople in Peru
Expatriate footballers in Peru